New Regime may refer to:
New Regime (American band), active 1979–85
New Regime (Canadian band), formed in 1982
The New Regime, a name used by musician Ilan Rubin for his solo work